Hans Heinrich von Halban (24 January 1908 – 28 November 1964) was a French physicist, of Austrian-Jewish descent.

Family 
He was descended on his father's side from Polish Jews, who left Kraków for Vienna in the 1850s. His grandfather, Heinrich Blumenstock, was a senior official in the Habsburg Empire and was ennobled by Emperor Franz Joseph I in the 1880s, taking the name of Ritter Heinrich Blumenstock von Halban.  The surname Blumenstock was subsequently dropped by the family, as was the use of 'von' after the Second World War.  His mother's family was from Bohemia and his great-grandfather, Moritz von Fialka, was a colonel in the Austro-Prussian War of 1866.

Although converted to Catholicism, the family were never religiously observant. Hans Halban was a convinced secularist.

Education and research 
Hans Halban was born in Leipzig and moved to Würzburg, where his father, Hans von Halban Sr. became a professor of physical chemistry. He began his studies in physics at Frankfurt/Main and finished his doctoral studies at the University of Zurich December 1934.

He then worked for two years with the nuclear physicist Niels Bohr at the Institute of Physics, University of Copenhagen. In collaboration with Otto Frisch he discovered that heavy water had very low neutron absorption compared with ordinary water.

In 1937 Halban was invited to join the team of Frédéric Joliot-Curie at the Collège de France in Paris.  The team also included Francis Perrin and Lew Kowarski. In 1939 the group measured the mean number of neutrons emitted during nuclear fission, and established the possibility of nuclear chain reactions and nuclear energy production. In August the group showed that the rate of fission in uranium oxide was increased by immersion in ordinary water.

During the same summer, the government of Édouard Daladier was able to purchase 185 kg of heavy water from Norsk Hydro in Norway and secretly fly it to France, for the use of the Collège de France team.

Second World War 
With the German occupation of Paris in May 1940, Halban and Kowarski left Paris with the supply of heavy water, a gramme of radium and the documentation of their research, as instructed by Joliot-Curie. He escaped France, via Clermont-Ferrand and Bordeaux, to England. He was invited by Churchill's government to continue his research at Cambridge University. In 1942, along with British and other European "refugee scientists", Halban was sent to Montreal as head of the research laboratories at the Montreal Laboratory, part of the nascent Manhattan Project.

Halban was divorced from his first wife, Els (née Andriesse, who later married the Czech physicist George Placzek). And in 1943, Halban married Aline Elisabeth Yvonne Strauss (née de Gunzbourg), who had escaped France in 1941 with her young son Michel. This marriage would also end in divorce, Aline marrying the philosopher Isaiah Berlin in 1956.

Following the Liberation of Paris in August 1944, Halban returned on a visit to London and Paris, where he saw Joliot-Curie for the first time since leaving France. Although he maintained that he did not divulge any nuclear secrets to his previous boss (Joliot-Curie), General Groves, the head of the Manhattan Project, had Halban removed from his job in Montreal, and replaced by John Cockcroft. Furthermore, Halban was not allowed to leave North America for a year, nor to work.

Post-war 

Contrary to his expectations, Halban was not invited back to the Collège de France after the war. Instead, he was invited back to England by Frederick Lindemann (Lord Cherwell) to lead a team at the Clarendon Laboratory at Oxford University, closely connected to the Atomic Energy Research Establishment (the Harwell Laboratory).

After eight productive years at Oxford, Halban was invited back to France in 1954 by the Prime Minister, Pierre Mendès-France, to direct the building of a nuclear research laboratory at Saclay, outside Paris, which greatly expanded the French Commissariat à l'énergie atomique (Atomic Energy Commission). He took up the appointment in 1955, following his divorce from his wife Aline, who shortly afterwards married Isaiah Berlin. The CEA Saclay laboratory developed the independent French nuclear bomb and oversaw the development of French civil nuclear energy.

Last years 

Due to ill health, Halban was obliged to retire in 1961. He spent the last three years of his life in Paris and Crans-sur-Sierre, Switzerland with his third wife, Micheline (née Lazard-Vernier).

He died on 28 November 1964 from complications following an unsuccessful heart operation at the American Hospital of Paris, leaving three children: Catherine Maud, from his first marriage, and Pierre (Peter) and Philippe from his second. He is buried in Larchant, near Paris.

Recently discovered documents 
In 1940, James Chadwick forwarded the work of Halban and Lew Kowarski, from Cambridge to the Royal Society. He asked that the papers be held as they were not appropriate for publication during the war. In 2007, the Society discovered the documents during an audit of their archives.

See also 
Frédéric Joliot-Curie
Lew Kowarski
ZEEP
Dési von Halban

References

External links 
.

1908 births
1964 deaths
French physicists
Manhattan Project people
People associated with the nuclear weapons programme of the United Kingdom
French people of Polish-Jewish descent
Austrian knights
20th-century Polish nobility
Scientists from Paris
German emigrants to France